Kirk M. Acevedo (born November 27, 1971) is an American actor. He is primarily known for his work on television for the portrayals of Miguel Alvarez in the HBO series Oz, Joe Toye in Band of Brothers, and FBI Agent Charlie Francis in the science-fiction series Fringe. His best-known films are The Thin Red Line, Dinner Rush and Dawn of the Planet of the Apes. He also portrayed the character of José Ramse on Syfy's 12 Monkeys (20152018), as well as comic book villain Ricardo Diaz / The Dragon on The CW's Arrow (20172019).

Early life
Acevedo's parents were born in New York City and lived in the Bronx, where both their sons, Richard and Kirk Acevedo, were born and raised. Since childhood, Acevedo has shown an interest in acting; he performed before his family in improvised shows. Acevedo was a drama major in high school.

After graduating from LaGuardia High School of Music & Art and Performing Arts, Acevedo enrolled in the SUNY Purchase School of Acting (Purchase College). In the 1990s, Acevedo earned his Bachelor of Fine Arts degree and, as some of his classmates had landed parts shortly after auditioning for Oz, he was also motivated to try out, and subsequently landed the role of the half-crazed gang leader prisoner Miguel Alvarez.

Career 
After landing the role of Miguel Alvarez on Oz, Acevedo was promoted to series regular in season two and appeared in the following episodes: 1–26; 34–36 and 41–56. Among his other most notable credits include his roles in Law & Order: Trial by Jury (2005) as Hector Salazar and HBO's Band of Brothers (2001), produced by Steven Spielberg, as Staff sergeant Joe Toye.

He had guest starring roles on well known television shows such as NYPD Blue and 24. He had a notable recurring role on the television show The Black Donnellys.

Some of his most well known movies and miniseries he has starred in include The Thin Red Line, Invincible (2006), Boiler Room (2000), Dinner Rush (2000), Arresting Gena (1997) and Kirk and Kerry (1997). He voices Jackie Estacado in The Darkness, the video game adaptation of the comic book.

In 2008, he landed a supporting role on the Fox science fiction horror television series Fringe as Charlie Francis. He starred on the show's first season and in the episode "Unleashed", Acevedo's real-life wife, actress Kiersten Warren portrayed his on-screen wife. His character was killed in the second season premiere, though Acevedo made two further appearances portraying a shape-shifting imposter. Following the fifth episode of season two, Acevedo was no longer credited as a main cast member due to the shapeshifter's death in the previous episode. Though he is credited as a main cast member for a standalone episode filmed at the end of the first season titled "Unearthed" that was broadcast as the eleventh episode of the second season. His character's reappearance in the episode after being killed off has led to confusion among viewers of the series. 

Acevedo officially returned as a guest star in Fringe for the second season finale as the parallel universe version of his character, and continued this recurring role for six episodes of the third season.

In 2011, he joined the main cast of the short-lived U.S remake of Prime Suspect portraying Detective Luisito Calderon. Initially, it was reported Alt-Charlie would appear in fewer episodes of the fourth season of Fringe, though this never happened and he never reappeared in the series following the third season episode "Bloodline". Acevedo later appeared on The Walking Dead for two episodes of the fourth season.

He has starred in the Syfy television series 12 Monkeys. Acevedo was cast in a recurring role in the sixth season of The CW television series Arrow in August 2017 as Ricardo Diaz and was promoted to series regular for the first 14 episodes of season seven.

Filmography

Film

Television

Video games

Accolades 
In 1999, Acevedo won an ALMA Award for his role in The Thin Red Line. He was nominated in the "Outstanding Featured Actor in a Play" category in 1997 for the Drama Desk Award for Tooth of Crime. He was nominated for a total of four ALMA Awards for his role in Oz for the following years 1997, 1998, 2000, and 2001. He co-founded the theater company, The Rorschach Group, with Shea Whigham.

See also 

List of Puerto Ricans
Chinese immigration to Puerto Rico

References

External links
 
 

1971 births
Living people
American people of Puerto Rican descent
American male television actors
Hispanic and Latino American male actors
Male actors from New York City
State University of New York at Purchase alumni
20th-century American male actors
21st-century American male actors
American male film actors
Fiorello H. LaGuardia High School alumni
People from Brooklyn
Entertainers from the Bronx